General Duke may refer to the following:

 General Duke  a character in the StarCraft series of video games
 General Duke (horse) - a 19th-century American racehorse
 Gen. Duke - a 20th-century American racehorse
 Basil W. Duke - a Confederate general in the 19th century